Pak Kung Au is the name of three different areas in Hong Kong:

 Pak Kung Au (Islands), on Lantau Island, in Islands District
 Pak Kung Au (North District), in North District
 Pak Kung Au (Sai Kung District), east of Kowloon Peak, in Sai Kung District

zh:伯公坳 (消歧義)